Cogia outis, known generally as the outis skipper or button-grass skipper, is a species of dicot skipper in the butterfly family Hesperiidae.

References

Further reading

 

Eudaminae
Articles created by Qbugbot